The StreetScooter C16 was an electric car shown in 2014 by the electric vehicle manufacturer StreetScooter (otherwise known for making electric commercial vehicles).

The 2-seater city car had a metal frame, however all of its exterior plastic parts were 3D-printed on the Objet1000 printer by Stratasys using ABS polymer. The production vehicle was meant to weigh about 450 kg without the battery, have a minimum range of 100 km, reach a top speed of 100 km/h and have a price tag of under 10,000 EUR.

The vehicle was shown at the EuroMold in Frankfurt in 2014.

References

Electric cars